Juljan Shehu (born 6 September 1998) is a professional footballer who plays as a midfielder for Widzew Łódź. Born in Albania's capital, Tirana, he has represented Albania at youth level.

References

2000 births
Living people
Footballers from Tirana
Albanian footballers
Association football midfielders
Albania youth international footballers
Albania under-21 international footballers
Paniliakos F.C. players
KF Laçi players
KS Kastrioti players
KF Tirana players
Widzew Łódź players
Kategoria e Parë players
Kategoria Superiore players
Ekstraklasa players
Albanian expatriate footballers
Expatriate footballers in Poland
Albanian expatriate sportspeople in Poland